Daniel Santos Bragança (born 27 May 1999) is a Portuguese professional footballer who plays as a midfielder for Sporting CP.

Club career
Born in Fazendas de Almeirim, Santarém District, Bragança spent his entire youth career with Sporting CP. On 10 January 2019, he was loaned to LigaPro club Farense until the end of the season. He scored his first goal on 14 April to open a 3–1 home win against Estoril, and followed it five days later with another in a 1–1 draw with Penafiel also at the Estádio de São Luís.

Bragança was loaned again to a second tier side on 9 August 2019, this time Estoril. He was sent off on 3 November for pulling the hair of Académico de Viseu's Kelvin Medina, and received a two-match ban.

Bragança made his Sporting competitive debut on 24 September 2020 in the third qualifying round of the UEFA Europa League at home to Aberdeen, as an 86th-minute substitute for Wendel in a 1–0 victory. Three days later he appeared in his first Primeira Liga game, a 2–0 away defeat of Paços de Ferreira where he featured 25 minutes in place of Luciano Vietto. He finished the campaign with 25 official appearances – 20 in the league – for the champions, and was given an improved salary at its closure.

On 18 December 2021, Bragança scored his first goal for Sporting, closing the 3–0 away defeat of Gil Vicente. He missed the vast majority of 2022–23 due to an anterior cruciate ligament injury.

International career
On 5 September 2019, Bragança won his first cap for the Portugal under-21 team, playing the entire 4–0 win against Gibraltar for the 2021 UEFA European Championship qualifiers.

Honours
Sporting CP
Primeira Liga: 2020–21
Taça da Liga: 2020–21, 2021–22

References

External links

1999 births
Living people
People from Almeirim
Sportspeople from Santarém District
Portuguese footballers
Association football midfielders
Primeira Liga players
Liga Portugal 2 players
Sporting CP footballers
S.C. Farense players
G.D. Estoril Praia players
Portugal youth international footballers
Portugal under-21 international footballers